Norman E. Olson (March 19, 1915 – April 8, 1944) was a U.S. Army Air Forces World War II flying ace. He shot down seven enemy aircraft in the European theatre of World War II. Olson died in aerial combat on April 8, 1944. He was the first Ace pilot of the 355th Fighter Group.

Early life
He was born in Winnipeg, Canada and lived in Fargo, North Dakota. He graduated from Fargo High School. He spent two years in Milwaukee, Wisconsin attending Marquette university. Before moving to Fargo, Olson spent time as a commercial photographer in Eau Claire, Wisconsin. In 1941 Olson enlisted in the United States Army.

Career

Olson enlisted in the Army in 1941 and was stationed in Europe in 1943. Olson was flying a P-47 when he destroyed an enemy aircraft Bf-109 in aerial combat over Siegen on February 20, 1944. Olson and his unit were returning from a mission over a Nazi airdome Brunswick, Germany, when Olson was shot down by ground fire. The other fighters in Olson's unit only made one pass, but Olson made three.

Awards

Air Medal
American Campaign Medal
Army Good Conduct Medal
Congressional Gold Medal (2015)
Distinguished Flying Cross for extraordinary achievement
European-African-Middle Eastern Campaign
Army Presidential Unit Citation
Purple Heart
United States Aviator Badge Army
World War II Victory Medal

See also
List of World War II aces from the United States
List of World War II flying aces

References

Further reading

Notes

1915 births
1944 deaths
American World War II flying aces
Military personnel from North Dakota
United States Army Air Forces pilots of World War II
Recipients of the Distinguished Flying Cross (United States)
United States Army Air Forces personnel killed in World War II
Aviators killed by being shot down
Canadian emigrants to the United States